Eodorcadion maurum is a species of beetle in the family Cerambycidae. It was described by Jakovlev in 1890. It is known from Mongolia.

Subspecies
 Eodorcadion maurum katharinae (Reitter, 1898).
 Eodorcadion maurum maurum (Jakovlev, 1890).
 Eodorcadion maurum quinquevittatum (Hammerström, 1893).
 Eodorcadion maurum sajanicum (Hammerström, 1893).

References

Dorcadiini
Beetles described in 1890